Lafayette Township is one of thirteen townships in Owen County, Indiana, United States. As of the 2010 census, its population was 1,207 and it contained 565 housing units.

History
Lafayette Township was organized in 1839.

Moffett-Ralston House was listed on the National Register of Historic Places in 1975.

Geography

Unincorporated towns
 Vandalia at

Cemeteries
The township contains these seven cemeteries: Fender, Galimore, Palestine, Saint Walley, Splinter Ridge, Tipton and Wright.

Major highways
  Indiana State Road 46

School districts
 Spencer-Owen Community Schools

Political districts
 State House District 46
 State Senate District 37
 State Senate District 39

References
 
 United States Census Bureau 2009 TIGER/Line Shapefiles
 IndianaMap

External links
 Indiana Township Association
 United Township Association of Indiana
 City-Data.com page for Lafayette Township

Townships in Owen County, Indiana
Townships in Indiana